Religion in Congo may refer to the following:

 Religion in the Democratic Republic of the Congo
 Religion in the Republic of the Congo